William Curtis Carr, III (born November 29, 1945) is an American retired college football player, coach, and athletics administrator.  Carr was born in Gainesville, Florida, raised in Pensacola, Florida, and attended the University of Florida, where he was an All-American center for the Florida Gators football team in the mid-1960s. He served in the United States Army for two years, and after an unsuccessful attempt to make a National Football League roster, Carr returned to UF as an assistant football coach. He soon moved into sports administration at the school, and in 1979, he became the athletic director at the University of Florida at the age of 33, making him the youngest athletic director among major universities at the time. He later served as the athletic director at the University of Houston and has been involved in college sports consulting since the late 1990s.

Early life 

Carr was born in Gainesville, Florida, the son of a Baptist minister.  He grew up in Vero Beach and Pensacola, Florida.  Carr attended Pensacola High School, and was a standout high school football player for the Pensacola Tigers.  Following his senior season, he was recognized as a first-team all-state selection.

College years 

Carr accepted an athletic scholarship to attend the University of Florida in Gainesville, where he was the center for coach Ray Graves' Florida Gators football team from 1964 to 1966.  Carr was the roommate of the Gators' Heisman Trophy-winning quarterback Steve Spurrier before Spurrier's marriage in September 1966, and was a team captain his senior year.  He was named a first-team All-Southeastern Conference selection and a first-team All-American in 1966.  Carr and the Gators concluded the 1966 season with a 27–12 victory over the Georgia Tech Yellow Jackets in the 1967 Orange Bowl.

Carr graduated from Florida with a bachelor's degree in Spanish in 1968, and was later inducted into the University of Florida Athletic Hall of Fame as a "Gator Great."

Professional football and military service 

The New Orleans Saints selected Carr in the fourth round (106th pick overall) of the 1967 NFL Draft. When he returned to the Saints after two years in the U.S. Army, he did not make the final roster cut in the preseason.

Coach, athletic director and consultant 
Carr retired as a player and returned to the University of Florida in 1970 to serve as a football graduate assistant under head coach Doug Dickey while earning a master's degree in education. He then served as an assistant junior varsity coach and academic advisor while studying sports administration, and in 1974, he became an assistant to Florida athletic director Ray Graves. Carr was promoted to the position of assistant athletic director in 1976, and when Graves retired in 1979, Carr was promoted to fill his position, making him the youngest Division I athletic director in the country at the time.

While leading the University of Florida Athletic Association, Carr was credited with improving the athletic department's financial footing and sports facilities (including a major expansion of Florida Field and the construction of the O'Connell Center), setting the stage for future success and helping make possible the Gators' first conference football championship in 1984. However, he also oversaw a scandal which saw that football championship vacated for recruiting and other NCAA violations under head coach Charlie Pell. Carr resigned in 1986 and was succeeded by Bill Arnsparger.

After leaving Florida, Carr served as the executive director of a youth advocacy group and a vice-president at Raycom Sports before returning to sports administration as the athletic director at the University of Houston from 1993 to 1997. After leaving Houston, Carr founded and led an intercollegiate athletics consulting group for several years before semi-retiring to serve as an executive coach in 2020.

See also 

1966 College Football All-America Team
Florida Gators
Florida Gators football, 1960–69
History of the University of Florida
Houston Cougars
List of University of Florida alumni
List of University of Florida Athletic Hall of Fame members
University Athletic Association

References

Bibliography 

 Carlson, Norm, University of Florida Football Vault: The History of the Florida Gators, Whitman Publishing, LLC, Atlanta, Georgia (2007).  .
 Golenbock, Peter, Go Gators!  An Oral History of Florida's Pursuit of Gridiron Glory, Legends Publishing, LLC, St. Petersburg, Florida (2002).  .
 Hairston, Jack, Tales from the Gator Swamp: A Collection of the Greatest Gator Stories Ever Told, Sports Publishing, LLC, Champaign, Illinois (2002).  .
 McCarthy, Kevin M.,  Fightin' Gators: A History of University of Florida Football, Arcadia Publishing, Mount Pleasant, South Carolina (2000).  .
 McEwen, Tom, The Gators: A Story of Florida Football, The Strode Publishers, Huntsville, Alabama (1974).  .
 Nash, Noel, ed., The Gainesville Sun Presents The Greatest Moments in Florida Gators Football, Sports Publishing, Inc., Champaign, Illinois (1998).  .

1945 births
Living people
All-American college football players
American football centers
Florida Gators athletic directors
Florida Gators football coaches
Florida Gators football players
Houston Cougars athletic directors
Players of American football from Pensacola, Florida
Sportspeople from Gainesville, Florida
Sportspeople from Pensacola, Florida
Players of American football from Gainesville, Florida